Stal Nysa SA is a Polish professional men's volleyball team based in Nysa, founded in 1948. One time Polish Cup winner. The club currently plays in the top level Polish Volleyball League – PlusLiga.

Honours
 Polish Cup
Winners (1): 1995–96

Team
As of 2022–23 season

Coaching staff

Players

Former names

See also

References

External links
 Official website 
 Team profile at PlusLiga.pl
 Team profile at Volleybox.net

Polish volleyball clubs
Volleyball clubs established in 1948
Sport in Opole Voivodeship